William Yaw Obeng (born April 14, 1983) is a former American football offensive lineman of the Arena Football League. He was signed by the Minnesota Vikings as an undrafted free agent in 2005. He played college football at San Jose State.

Obeng was also a member of the Oakland Raiders, San Jose SaberCats and Arizona Rattlers.

Before San Jose State, Obeng attended Mesabi Range Community and Technical College.

External links
Arena Football League bio
Arizona Rattlers bio

1983 births
Living people
Sportspeople from Accra
American sportspeople of Ghanaian descent
Ghanaian players of American football
Players of American football from Chicago
American football offensive tackles
San Jose State Spartans football players
Minnesota Vikings players
Oakland Raiders players
Rhein Fire players
San Jose SaberCats players
Arizona Rattlers players
Cologne Centurions (NFL Europe) players
Alabama Vipers players
Mesabi Range Norse football players